The Yaw people live in Gangaw District, Burma and Pakokku District number about 20,000 people. They speak the Yaw dialect of the Burmese language.

References

External links
Yaw Region - Today in Myanmar Retrieved 7 February 2011.

Ethnic groups in Myanmar
Buddhist communities of Myanmar
Sino-Tibetan-speaking people